Lucie Mannheim (30 April 1899 – 17 July 1976) was a German singer and actress.

Life and career
Mannheim was born in Köpenick, Berlin, where she studied drama and quickly became a popular figure appearing on stage in plays and musicals. Among other roles, she played Nora in Ibsen's A Doll's House, Marie in Büchner's Woyzeck, and Juliet in Shakespeare's Romeo and Juliet. She also began a film career in 1923, appearing in several silent and sound films including Atlantik (1929) – the first of many versions of the story of the ill-fated RMS Titanic. The composer Walter Goetze wrote his operetta Die göttliche Jette (1931) especially for Mannheim.

However, as a Jew she was forced from acting in 1933, when her contract at the State Theatre was cancelled. She promptly left Germany, first going to Czechoslovakia, then to the UK. She appeared in several films there, including her role as the doomed spy Annabella Smith in Alfred Hitchcock's version of The 39 Steps (1935).

During the Second World War, she appeared in several films, as well as broadcasting propaganda to Germany – including performing an anti-Hitler version of Lili Marleen, in 1943. In 1941, she married the actor Marius Goring.

She returned to Germany in 1948 and resumed her career as an actress on stage and in film. In 1955 she joined the cast of the British television series The Adventures of the Scarlet Pimpernel as Countess La Valliere, which starred her husband. She made her final English language film appearance in the film Bunny Lake Is Missing (1965). Her last appearance was in a 1970 TV film. She died in Braunlage, Lower Saxony.

Filmography

 Between Two Worlds (1919)
 The Stone Rider (1923) – Hirtin
 The Treasure (1923) – Beate
 Princess Suwarin (1923) – Esterka Kipman
 The Expulsion (1923, Short) – Änne
 The Doll Maker of Kiang-Ning (1923)
 Atlantik (1929) – Monica, young married couple
 Danton (1931) – Louise Gely
  (1931) – Jeanne Kampf
 Madame Wants No Children (1933) – Luise
 The 39 Steps (1935) – Miss Smith
 East Meets West (1936) – Marguerite Carter
 The High Command (1937) – Diana Cloam
 Yellow Canary (1944) – Madame Orlock
 Tawny Pipit (1944) – Russian Sniper
 Hotel Reserve (1944) – Mme Suzanne Koch
 Nights on the Road (1952) – Anna, Schlueter's wife
 So Little Time (1952) – Lotte Schönberg
 The Man Who Watched Trains Go By (1952) – Maria Popinga
 I and You (1953) – Tante Gruber
 The Perfect Couple (1954) – Alwine Steingass
 Secrets of the City (1955) – Karina
 You Can No Longer Remain Silent (1955) – Lobba, die Magd
 Doctor Bertram (1957)
 Confess, Doctor Corda (1958) – Haushälterin Bieringer
 Ihr 106. Geburtstag (1958) – Clementine Burger
 Iron Gustav (1958) – Frau Marie Hartmann
 Arzt aus Leidenschaft (1959) – Frau Friedberg – seine Mutter
 Beyond the Curtain (1960) – Frau von Seefeldt
 The Last Witness (1960) – Frau Bernhardy
 Bunny Lake Is Missing (1965) – Cook
 First Love (1970)

Awards
Mannheim was awarded the West German Commander's Cross of the Order of Merit in 1959, and made a Staatsschauspieler ("State Actor") for Berlin in 1963.

References

External links
 
 
 

1899 births
1976 deaths
Commanders Crosses of the Order of Merit of the Federal Republic of Germany
German expatriates in England
German film actresses
German silent film actresses
Jewish emigrants from Nazi Germany to the United Kingdom
Actresses from Berlin
Women in World War II
20th-century German actresses
German stage actresses
20th-century German musicians
20th-century German women singers